John Barlow may refer to:

Politicians
John Barlow (died 1718), MP for Haverfordwest
John Barlow (died 1739), MP for Pembrokeshire (UK Parliament constituency)
Sir John Barlow, 1st Baronet (1857–1932), British businessman and Member of Parliament
Sir John Barlow, 2nd Baronet (1898–1986), British Member of Parliament 1951–1966
John Barlow (Canadian politician) (born 1971), Canadian Member of Parliament from 2014 until present
John M. Barlow (1833–1903), American businessman and politician

Others
John Barlow (diplomat), English Tudor diplomat and spy
John Barlow (priest) (1799–1869), Anglican clergyman and scientist
John Barlow (entomologist) (1872–1944), American entomologist and college administrator
John Barlow, New Zealander convicted of murdering businessmen Gene and Eugene Thomas
John Barlow (novelist) (born 1967), English novelist
 John Barlow (veterinary surgeon) (1815–1856), British professor in Edinburgh and father of John Henry Barlow
John Brereton Barlow (1924–2008), South African cardiologist
John Henry Barlow (1855–1924), British Quaker "ambassador for peace", son of John Barlow (veterinary scientist)
John Noble Barlow (1861–1917), English impressionist painter
John Peleg Barlow (1918–1985), American oceanographer
John Perry Barlow (1947–2018), American digital rights activist and former lyricist for the Grateful Dead
John W. Barlow (1838–1914), career officer in the United States Army
John Y. Barlow (1874–1949), Mormon fundamentalist and polygamist
F. John Barlow, American businessman and mineral collector, see Barlow Planetarium
Sir John Barlow, 1st Baronet of Slebetch ( 1652–1695), of the Barlow baronets